Narayanan, better known as Pasi Narayanan, was an Indian stage and film actor known for performing comedic roles alongside actor Goundamani. Narayanan acted in over 500 Tamil-language films and is known for the catchphrase,

Early life 
Narayanan was born in Sivakasi district of Tamil Nadu and started acting at the age of 15.

Career 
He later acted in several dramas in 1955 through Manohar Company. After that he got a chance to act in the cinema industry. He came to the Tamil film industry in the 1960s. He became popular with the film Pasi. He then went on to become famous in the screen world under the pseudonym 'Pasi' Narayanan. In addition to acting, he had talent in storytelling, writing and dancing. M.G.R and Jayalalithaa has acted in the popular Tamil movie 'Aayirathil Oruvan'. Pasi Narayanan was also involved in many films of the next generation of leading heroes like Rajinikanth and Kamal Haasan, Pandiyarajan, Karthick, Sarth Kumar.

Family 
His wife name is Valli, he has 3 children. His third daughter's name is Gana Jyothi and his son's name is Mariappan. His second daughter's name is Revathi.

Death 
In 1998, he developed heart disease and later died from heart failure. His last movie was Ninaithen Vandhai.

Filmography

1960s

1970s

1980s

1990s

References 

1998 deaths
Tamil male actors
Indian male film actors
Tamil comedians
Indian male comedians
Male actors from Tamil Nadu
People from Virudhunagar district